Endophenazine A is a phenazine derivative with the molecular formula C18H16N2O2 which is produced by the bacterium Streptomyces anulatus.

References

Further reading 

 
 

Endophenazine A
Carboxylic acids